, provisional designation , is a stony near-Earth object and potentially hazardous asteroid of the Apollo group, approximately  in diameter. It was discovered on 27 December 2014 by the Catalina Sky Survey at the Catalina Station in Arizona, United States. In March 2015, a minor-planet moon, less than half the size of its primary, was discovered by radar astronomers at Goldstone Observatory. The primary body of the binary system has a rotation period of 3.3 hours, while the secondary's orbital period remains unknown.

Orbit and classification 

 is a member of the Apollo asteroids, a group of near-Earth object with an Earth-crossing orbit. It orbits the Sun at a distance of 1.0–2.8 AU once every 2 years and 7 months (939 days; semi-major axis of 1.88 AU). Its orbit has an eccentricity of 0.48 and an inclination of 13° with respect to the ecliptic. The body's observation arc begins at with its official discovery observation at Catalina Station in December 2014.

Close encounters 

Satellite  
The Goldstone Deep Space Communications Complex was scheduled to observe this object on 20 March 2015, at which time it was expected they could obtain coarse radar images and continuous wave spectra, which may help determine the asteroid's composition. These observations showed a small companion less than 150 meters across orbiting the asteroid, with an unknown orbit.

Numbering and naming 

This minor planet was numbered by the Minor Planet Center on 25 September 2018. As of 2018, it has not been named.

See also 
 List of asteroid close approaches to Earth in 2015

Notes

References

External links 
 MPEC 2014-Y89: 2014 YB35, Minor Planet Electronic Circular at the IAU Minor Planet Center
 Asteroids with Satellites at Johnstonsarchive.net
 Binary and Ternary Near-Earth Asteroids Detected by Radar by the Jet Propulsion Laboratory
  at the IAU Minor Planet Center
 
 
 

523775
523775
523775
523775
523775
20150327
20141227